The Gavins Point National Fish Hatchery is a fish hatchery administered by the U.S. Fish and Wildlife Service, located approximately 4 miles west of Yankton, in Yankton County, South Dakota, United States. The hatchery is located just below Gavins Point Dam, near the Missouri River.

The fish hatchery was built by the U.S. Army Corps of Engineers, following construction of Gavins Point Dam. The purpose of the hatchery is to help maintain fisheries in the Missouri River Basin, following impacts to natural river flows and loss of habitat due to development and channelization of the Missouri River Basin. 

Hatchery staff rear threatened and endangered fish species, including the Pallid sturgeon and American paddlefish. The hatchery also rears and stocks many game fish species including: walleye, Bluegill, yellow perch, Rainbow trout, Largemouth bass, Smallmouth bass, Black crappie and others throughout the Missouri River Region. The hatchery complex is open to the public and contains a small exhibit area, administrative offices, 2 hatching jar batteries, 9 indoor cement tanks, workshop, and feed room. Visitors are welcome to view the eggs in the hatching jars and the fish being raised in the tanks. Eight outdoor raceways are used to rear trout and to temporarily hold other species. Six 1/6 acre and 30 1.3-acre earthen ponds are used to for raising cool and warm water fish.

Aquarium
A total of thirteen indoor tanks display many of the fish, reptile, and amphibian species found in the Missouri River basin, along with informational displays on endangered, threatened, and unusual species. The Aquarium is open to the public daily from May 1 through Labor Day from 10 a.m. to 5 p.m., and is located just off SD 52.

See also
National Fish Hatchery System
Missouri River
List of National Fish Hatcheries in the United States
List of dams in the Missouri River watershed

References

External links
Gavins Point National Fish Hatchery
U.S. Fish and Wildlife Service - Fisheries
Missouri River Recovery Program

Buildings and structures in Yankton County, South Dakota
National Fish Hatcheries of the United States
Tourist attractions in Yankton County, South Dakota